Conquest, an initiative by students at the Center for Entrepreneurial Leadership at BITS Pilani, Pilani Campus is India's first Student-Run Startup Accelerator. They work on helping the best founders build great businesses and raise money. Their program includes online mentoring to the ten most exciting startups from across the country over six weeks, connecting them with field experts. Following this, the startups undergo a ten-day mentorship program in Bangalore, learning from people who have built great companies themselves and networking with India's biggest investors. Throughout these ten days, we give them a great place to live and work together. The program ends with the Grand Finale where these startups pitch before India's biggest investment firms and media houses.

For over seventeen years now, Conquest has been providing aspiring founders a platform to take their startups to the next level. It is the indomitable ambition of the students running the program, aided by the investment partners and the startup community, that has allowed it to reach where it is today and it only seems to be growing stronger every subsequent year. In its past editions, Conquest has accelerated the progress of startups like Trell, a lifestyle social media startup that is currently valued at $45 million, and SocialCops, a data intelligence startup that has been acclaimed by PM Narendra Modi.

About
India has witnessed a commendable upsurge in the number of startups in the past few years. With about 40K+ startups and 38 unicorns recognized by the Indian government, the ecosystem is thriving more than ever before. Right from seed capital to unicorn-level acquisitions, the Indian market is rich with opportunities.

What started out as a B-Plan competition in 2004 in BITS Pilani is now India's first and largest student-run non-profit startup accelerator. Conquest, backed by Canara bank VC and Icertis,  aims to create an impact on the entrepreneurial world by assisting startups to navigate through an already challenging startup ecosystem.

Although India stands third in the world when it comes to the number of startups in a country, its ranking in terms of impactful startups significantly falls behind in the international community. The supporting framework required by startups to truly succeed has been playing catch-up to the booming entrepreneurial spirit of the nation. Conquest is determined to solve this problem by connecting these startups with the top industry leaders, mentors, and investors from across the country, thus creating new opportunities and giving them access to an immense pool of knowledge coming from the decades of experience possessed by such a cohort...

Past Editions of Conquest

Conquest 2011–2013 
In 2011, Conquest received a facelift by bringing about a few worthwhile changes in the format. The startups were, for the first time, given the opportunity to choose their mentors and each mentor was allowed to choose multiple startup ideas to mentor, at his own discretion. . This increased their chances of coming across an impressive startup and ensured a reiterated interest of the mentor in Conquest.

Another change that Conquest 2011 saw was a change in the medium of mentoring sessions. Instead of merely communicating through emails and telephone calls, the startups got the chance to meet their mentors in a face-to-face session. The sessions were held across 4 cities in India - New Delhi, Mumbai, Bangalore and Hyderabad simultaneously on July 22, 2011.

Conquest 2015 
In its 2015 edition, DCB Bank was selected as the Title sponsor. Conquest 2015 had a more streamlined application process through a tie-up with Applyifi, a newly launched platform that helped startups make online pitch-decks for investors. Over 1500 startups applied and were filtered down to 50 in number. After a three-month-long mentoring session, 50 startups were brought down to 10.

The Grand Finale took place at ITC Sheraton, New Delhi. Swagene, a Chennai based bio-tech startup, took the top honors and Gamezop, a New Delhi-based gaming platform, finished as runners-up.

Conquest enjoyed media presence from more than 60 media houses including leading media houses like Deccan Chronicle, CNBC-TV, Times of India, Indian Express, First Post, Economic Times, Business Standard  and the likes. Some of the notable mentions, who attended the finale, were Jagat Shah, V.N. Alok, Dev Khare, Rajesh Swahney, Samay Kohli, Neeru Sharma, Sanjay Nath and Satyen Kothari.
=== Conquest 2016 ===
Conquest 2016 aims to venture more into tier-II and tier-III cities, believing it to be the epicenter of the next startup revolution. Attracting close to 1200 applications this year, followed by a month ­long rigorous analysis of these startups on the grounds of their revenue model, market traction, customer acquisition, and various other parameters, the top 50 startups were shortlisted. These top 50 then attended one of the three networking sessions held in New Delhi, Mumbai, and Bengaluru.

Mentors shared their expert opinion with start­ups on critical aspects like Fundraising, Product Management, Customer Acquisition, Tech, and Operations. The top 10 startups were then selected by the jury to be a part of the Grand Finale. The itinerary consisted of 2 panel discussions, a pitching round for the Top 10 startups in front of investors from over 25 investment firms, a networking lunch, and interaction of the jury with the audience in the Fish Bowl round. The jury members included Dev Khare, MD at Lightspeed India Partners Advisors, Rajan Anandan, MD at Google India, Bharat Shanker, VC at Accel, and Murali Natrajan, MD & CEO at DCB Bank were amongst other distinguished industry leads.

Conquest 2019 
Conquest 2019 invited applications from startups across the world and has received 650+ applications from startups registered in India, Singapore, and other countries. The title sponsor for Conquest 2019 was LTI (Larsen & Toubro Infotech) and Deskera as associate partner. Conquest 2019 had a more streamlined application process through a tie-up with Applyifi and Startup Buddy, who helped with the shortlisting of top 15 startups for the mentorship stage. Each startup went through a 3-month-long mentoring session with various mentors in common sessions. A personal mentor was also assigned to each of the startups based on the need of the startups and selection by mentors. After 3 months' remote mentoring, a list of Top 11 startups was arrived at based on the feedback from mentors and questionnaires filled out by startups. The top 11 startups went through a further round of face-to-face mentoring and industry connect for a week at Bengaluru. The Grand Finale took place at The Leela Palace on 28 July 2019, Bengaluru. ScoutMyTrip, a Mumbai based travel-tech startup, took the top honours and HRBot, a Gurugram-based AI recruitment platform, finished as runners-up.

Conquest 2020 
With the onset of COVID, Conquest 2020 was held online. The number of registrations crossed 3000 and winning entries stood to win an equity-less cash prize of Rs 50 lakh and guaranteed investment up to Rs 50 crore from the event's investment partners. The startups attended investment workshops by leading firms like Accel Partners and Blume Ventures, along with premier networking sessions with successful founders and prominent CEOs from across the country including Suvonil Chatterjee from Ola Cabs, Abhishek Nayak from Accel, and Anuj Rathi from Swiggy among others.

The event concluded with the grand finale where the founders pitched their startup ideas before some of the country's largest VC funds featuring leading investors like Dev Khare from Lightspeed, Shanti Mohan from LetsVenture, Sanjay Nath from Blume, and Barath Shankar from Accel among others.

Conquest 2021
For its 17th edition, Conquest's first phase included one-on-one mentoring sessions for the top 40 startups where they got a chance to gather insights from established industry experts.  Varghese Mathew (AVP, BYJU’s), Mahesh Vandi Chalil (Head of Technology, BookMyShow), Anirvan Chowdhury (Investments, Blume Ventures), and Brijesh Bharadwaj (Director of Product, Dunzo) were among the 70+ confirmed mentors for these top 40 mentoring sessions. Having talked to a pool of sector-specific mentors, the startups received individualized feedback and guidance which is invaluable at an early stage.

The top 18 startups underwent a four-week long accelerator program that consisted of mentoring sessions on different verticals like product, fundraising, UI/UX, marketing, sales, design, and growth. This leg of the accelerator program included AMAs, fireside chats, panel discussions with industry experts like Ankur Warikoo with prominence both as founders and investors.

Newsreach, an Ahmedabad-based digital media, tech start-up, took the award home and the runner-up was Ecovia, a progressive, sustainable packaging company. The second runner-up was Backyard Creators, an innovative tech start-up addressing environmental, social, and medical problems, specifically in the healthcare and disability sectors.

References

External links
 

Entrepreneurship organizations
Competitions in India